John Kyle (born 1951) is a Councillor on Belfast City Council, and the former interim leader of the centre-left loyalist Progressive Unionist Party (PUP) in Northern Ireland. He joined the Ulster Unionist Party in 2022.

Background

Kyle was born in East Belfast and attended Grosvenor Grammar School and Queen's University Belfast (QUB). He graduated as a medical doctor in 1975 and has practiced medicine in Belfast and London. Since 1993, he has been a General Practitioner at Holywood Arches Health Centre.

Kyle was co-opted onto Belfast City Council following the death of party leader and MLA, David Ervine in 2007, sitting with party colleague Hugh Smyth. He is a member of Belfast City Council's Development Committee, Health and Environmental Services Committee, and the Parks and Leisure Committee.

Due to the planned change in local councils in Northern Ireland, the local elections due for 2009 were postponed, awaiting provisions for the new eleven-council model (as agreed by the DUP/Sinn Féin led government); and as a result Kyle, along with all other councillors remained in office. Kyle was re-elected to Belfast City Council in 2011. Following the resignation of Dawn Purvis MLA from the party on 3 June 2010, Kyle was selected as interim leader.  

Purvis' resignation came in the aftermath of a killing in the Shankill Road area of West Belfast, widely believed to be carried out by the PUP-linked Ulster Volunteer Force. Purvis announced that she could no longer "defend the indefensible", in a clear reference to the killing.  

Kyle as a result became interim leader of a party facing a very uncertain future; with no representation in the Northern Ireland Assembly, and loyalist politics in clear disagreement with the UVF.  On the day after the funeral of the murdered man, Kyle claimed that he believed that the UVF had still not decommissioned all of its weapons - as previously confirmed by the Independent Monitoring Commission.

A General Meeting of the Progressive Unionist Party held in Belfast on 10 June 2010 issued a statement detailing the Party's continued support of Dr Kyle as interim leader, whilst the party has "space and time for a period of mature and considered reflection with reference to its future direction." Kyle has campaigned over a period of years against expansion of the George Best Belfast City Airport because of alleged noise and other effects on householders.

In June 2022 the UUP nominated Kyle for its seat on the Education Authority board.

Personal life
Kyle lives in his native East Belfast, and is married with five grown children.

References

External links
Belfast City Council

1951 births
Living people
Members of Belfast City Council
Progressive Unionist Party politicians
Date of birth missing (living people)
Politicians from Belfast
General practitioners from Northern Ireland
Ulster Unionist Party councillors
Ulster Unionist Party politicians